Sphaerosomes (also spherosomes) or oleosomes are small cell organelles bounded by a single membrane which take part in storage and synthesis of lipids. 

These were first observed by Hanstein (1880) but discovered by Perner (1953). Term sphaerosomes was given by Dangeard.  Sphaerosomes are small spherical and refractile vesicles which are 0.5-1.0 µm in diameter. They arise from endoplasmic reticulum and are surrounded by a single but half-unit membrane with phospholipid monolayer having polar heads towards the cytosol and hydrophobic tails towards the inner side. 

The membrane is stabilised by proteins called oleosins, hence the name oleosomes. 98% of a sphaerosome is lipid. Proteins constitute the remaining 2%. Some proteins are probably enzymatic and take part in the synthesis of lipids. Because of the presence of lipids, sphaerosomes can be seen under light microscope after staining cells with Sudan dyes and osmium tetraoxide. Sphaerosomes occur abundantly in the endosperm cells of oil seeds. 

Sphaerosomes of some tissues (like tobacco endosperm, maize root tip, etc.) contain hydrolytic enzymes. Therefore, they are considered to have lysosomic activity. Lysosomes are the suicidal bags of cells. They dispose of the cells when they are infected and about to spread. They are also known as plant lysosome.

References

Organelles
Lipids

Trueman'S Elementary Biology Vol. I